This is a list of the Sites of Special Scientific Interest (SSSIs) in Warwickshire. English Nature, the designating body for SSSIs in England, uses the 1974–1996 county system. The majority of these sites are locally managed by the Warwickshire Wildlife Trust.

For other counties, see List of SSSIs by Area of Search.

Sites

References

 
Warwickshire
Sites of Special